Deconica angustispora is a mushroom that was discovered in the late 1930s and formally described by A.H. Smith in 1946 as a species of Psilocybe. It is very small and has rarely been documented.

References

Smith, A.H.; Hesler, L.R. 1946. New and unusual dark-spored agarics from North America. Journal of the Elisha Mitchell Scientific Society. 62:177-200

Strophariaceae
Fungi described in 1946
Fungi of North America
Taxa named by Alexander H. Smith